Andrew Havill (born 1 June 1965) is an English actor. With an extensive career on screen and stage beginning in the late 1980s, Havill has appeared in more than 40 films and 50 plays. After training in Oxford and London, he began his career in repertory theatre in 1989 and made his screen debut in 1993. Havill has since become a character actor of British costume dramas, with recent work including several credits in Bollywood cinema.

Education
Havill attended the University of Exeter, where he read English and Drama.

He spent four years with the National Youth Theatre of Great Britain, with roles in London theatre productions including Christopher Short's For Those in Peril at the Shaw Theatre, As You Like It at the Open Air Theatre in Regent's Park, and Reynard the Fox on the Drum Theatre Plymouth and south-west tour. At the Jeanetta Cochrane Theatre, Havill was in Henry V, Twelfth Night, and Ed Kemp's A Proper Place. He spent a further four years with the Royal Shakespeare Company (RSC).

Havill is also an alumnus of the Oxford University Dramatic Society, with roles in Oxford theatre productions including Twelfth Night at the Oxford Playhouse, The Recruiting Officer at New College Cloisters, and As You Like It at Lady Margaret Hall Gardens.

Career

Theatre
Beginning his career with the Royal Shakespeare Company, Havill was in The Woman in Black at London's Fortune Theatre in 1989 and 1996, played Lysander in A Midsummer Night's Dream in 1989, and Reynaldo in Hamlet the same year.

Throughout the 1990s, Havill performed in a number of plays at London's West End and elsewhere. He portrayed several characters at the Barbican Theatre in an RSC production of A Clockwork Orange and at The Pit London in A Woman of No Importance. In conjunction with the RSC, Havill's focus was Shakespeare; in 1990, he portrayed George Seacoal in Much Ado About Nothing, Peter Arnold in Two Shakespearean Actors and The Merchant in The Comedy of Errors; from 1991 to 1992, he portrayed Sir William Bagot in an RSC production of Richard II at the Barbican Theatre in London.

In 2003, Havill played Group Captain Windbreak in Justin Butcher's production of The Madness of George Dubya at the Arts Theatre in London. Michael Billington wrote in The Guardian that "Butcher's production... has a surprising jauntiness; ... Andrew Havill as an ineffectual group captain... stand[s] out." The following year, Havill was cast as the Reverend James Morell in George Bernard Shaw's Candida, for which The Guardian's Lyn Gardner wrote "Much of the pleasure of Christopher Luscombe's well-observed period production is in watching Andrew Havill's interesting Morell move from confident self-belief to bewildered self-doubt as he starts to understand that even goodness is a form of selfishness." Havills other stage roles of the 2000s include working with Alan Ayckbourn on his play Virtual Reality, a West End production of Jean Anouilh's Ring Around the Moon, and roles in director Chris Luscombe's productions of The Comedy of Errors and The Merry Wives of Windsor at Shakespeare's Globe. Of the latter, Gardner wrote "Havill's comic timing is a joy."

Havill also appeared as Frank Ford in The Merry Wives of Windsor US tour of 2010. Ben Brantley commented in The New York Times, "As Ford... the excellent Mr. Havill is exactly as serious as he needs to be, reminding us that one of comedy’s main functions is to defuse bombs that in real life often explode and destroy." In 2012 and 2013, he was part of the original cast of James Graham's play This House, at the National Theatre, directed by Jeremy Herrin. His work has included three roles at Hampstead Theatre in the plays Farewell to the Theatre, Drawing the Line, and Wonderland, and a portrayal of the English physician Sir Gilbert Wedgecroft in a National Theatre production of Waste, with Anne Cox writing "Havill offers excellent support... as always." In 2019, Havill portrayed Warren Lewis at the Chichester Festival Theatre's production of Shadowlands, along with actors Hugh Bonneville and Liz White; Havill starred alongside Bonneville in the Downtown Abbey film of the same year.

Television
Havill made his television debut in Lucy Gannon's Soldier Soldier in 1993, followed by a portrayal of English critic John Davenport in The House of Elliot Series 3 the following year. From 1997 to 1998, Havill worked with Lynda La Plante on her drama series Trial & Retribution, playing Clarence Oxley on Trial & Retribution I and Crispin Oxley on Trial & Retribution II. Havill starred in two 1999 television mini series: Aristocrats and Wives and Daughters as Charles Bunbury and Sir Charles Morton respectively.

In the 2000s, his television roles included portraying Manet on The Impressionists, Elizabeth David (in which he featured as the husband of cookery writer Elizabeth David in the docudrama about whom it was named),Daphne and The Tudors. He played the Chief Steward in the Christmas Doctor Who episode Voyage of the Damned and was in the BBC drama Spooks Series 8.

In 2011, Havill portrayed the Reverend Conrad Walker on ITV's Midsomer Murders (The Night of the Stag). In 2012, he played the Royal Equerry, Harry, in Sherlock (A Scandal in Belgravia), with WhatCulture's Christian Bone saying he was "known for playing well-spoken upper-class types." His work of the 2010s includes playing Victor McKinley on the BBC's Father Brown, Edward Sidwell on The Coroner Series 1, episode 8 (Napoleon's Violin), and Gareth Anderson on Vera (Natural Selection) in 2017.

Havill played factory owner, Douglas Broome in the 2021 series, The Nevers, and Professor Lucius Stamfield in Endeavour the same year. In the fifth season of The Crown (2022), he played Robert Fellowes, the Queen's private secretary and brother-in-law of Princess Diana.

Film
Havill made his film debut in 1995, portraying Galant on Michael Hoffman's Restoration. Following this, he played Algernon in Brian Gilbert's 1997 film Wilde and Piers in Clare Kilner's 1999 film Janice Beard.

In the 2000s, Havill's film work included roles in Thaddeus O'Sullivan's 2002 period drama The Heart of Me as Charles (the fiancé of Helena Bonham Carter's Dinah), Douglas McGrath's 2002 period comedy-drama Nicholas Nickleby, Christine Jeffs' 2003 biographical drama Sylvia, and Sean Ellis' 2008 horror film The Broken as Doctor Myers.

Beginning with The King's Speech in 2010, in which he portrayed the royal sound engineer Robert Wood, Havill has starred in a number of historical dramas in Britain and elsewhere. In 2011, he played the cabinet secretary to Meryl Streep's Margaret Thatcher in The Iron Lady; in 2012, he played Cameron, welcoming Olivia Colman's Queen Elizabeth the Queen Mother and Samuel West's King George VI to the United States in Hyde Park on Hudson; in 2014, he played Turing's professor in The Imitation Game; he portrayed the Archbishop of Canterbury in David Michôd's 2019 film The King and the 6th Earl of Harewood, Henry Lascelles, in the 2019 Downtown Abbey film. In Star Wars: The Rise of Skywalker of the same year, Havill played a First Order Officer warning Richard E. Grant's Allegiant General Pryde "they’re targeting the navigation tower, so the fleet can’t deploy". His work of the 2010s includes roles in The Awakening as George Vandermeer, Cloud Atlas as Mr. Hotchkiss, Dad's Army as Captain Meeks, My Cousin Rachel as Parson Pascoe, Gold as Sir James Benson, and Lyrebird as Maarten Wooning.

Havill portrayed Sir Philip Hendy in Roger Michell's 2020 film The Duke, along with actors Jim Broadbent and Helen Mirren. In 2021, he played Enid Baines' father George in Censor, delivering "sterling work" as a "button-down" parent. He played General Reginald Dyer in Bollywood's Sardar Udham of the same year.

Filmography

Film

Television

Theatre

References

External links
 
 

1965 births
Living people
Havill family
People from Oxford
People from Oxfordshire
British actors
English male stage actors
Shakespearean actors
British male Shakespearean actors
English male television actors
English male film actors
21st-century English male actors
20th-century English male actors
Male actors in Hindi cinema
Alumni of the University of Exeter
National Youth Theatre members
Royal Shakespeare Company members